Social Cues is the fifth studio album by American rock band Cage the Elephant. Announced on January 31, 2019, the album was released on April 19, 2019. The album is the first by the band to feature a title track. Social Cues won the award for Best Rock Album at the 62nd Annual Grammy Awards, making it the band's second album to win the award after Tell Me I'm Pretty.

Background
On November 26, 2018, the band announced on Twitter that their new album was "Done. Mixed. Mastered." On January 31, 2019, the band officially released "Ready to Let Go", the first single from Social Cues. On March 8, 2019, "House of Glass", the second advance track from the album was released. A collaboration with Beck, "Night Running" was released on March 28, 2019. The final song released in advance of the album was "Goodbye", released on April 8, 2019. Many of the songs (Such as "Goodbye", "Ready to Let Go", and "Love's the Only Way") were based on the divorce that Matt Shultz went through with his ex-wife, Juliette Buchs.

Reception

Social Cues received generally positive reviews upon its release. At Metacritic, which assigns a normalized rating of reviews from mainstream publications, it received a 75 out of 100 - indicating "generally favorable reviews". Social Cues has an average rating of 6.7 on AnyDecentMusic?.

Track listing

Personnel 
Cage the Elephant

 Nick Bockrath – lead guitar, pedal steel guitar, lap steel guitar, keyboards, celeste, cello
 Jared Champion – drums, percussion
 Matthan Minster – piano, keyboards, rhythm guitar, vibraphone, backing vocals
 Brad Shultz – rhythm guitar, keyboards
 Matt Shultz – lead vocals, rhythm guitar
 Daniel Tichenor – bass

Additional musicians

 Elliot Bergman – horn
 Jacob Braun – cello
 Charlie Bisharat – violin
 David Campbell – string arrangements, conductor
 Matt Combs – cello, violin, viola
 Gina Corso – violin
 Kyle Davis – percussion
 Mario Deleon – violin
 Lisa Dodlinger – violin
 Andrew Duckles – viola
 Beck – vocals
 John Hill – keyboards
 Leah Katz – viola
 Ginger Murphy – cello
 Sara Parkins – violin
 Kerenza Peacock – violin
 Katie Schecter – backing vocals
 Dave Stone – bass
 Steve Trudell – string contractor
 The W. Crimm Singers – backing vocals

Production

 Rob Cohen – engineering
 Tom Elmhirst – mixing
 Jeremy Ferguson – engineer
 David Greenbaum – engineer
 John Hill – production
 Randy Merrill – mastering

Charts

References

2019 albums
Cage the Elephant albums
Grammy Award for Best Rock Album